Oklahoma City Energy Football Club is an American professional soccer club based in Oklahoma City, Oklahoma. The club is a member of the USL Championship, the second division of the American soccer league system. Although having not officially ceased operations, the club is currently not fielding a roster and has relieved head coach Leigh Veidman,[3] having canceled their 2022 and 2023 seasons. The club cites inability to meet league requirements for field conditions.[4]

History
Oklahoma City businessman Robert "Bob" Funk, Jr., was awarded a United Soccer League franchise on July 2, 2013, and in November, the club announced its name would be Oklahoma City Energy FC. The ownership group, Prodigal LLC, formerly Express sports, which operated the Oklahoma City Barons of the American Hockey League and formerly oversaw the Oklahoma City Dodgers (formerly Oklahoma/Oklahoma City Redhawks.) baseball team of the Pacific Coast League and the owned Oklahoma City Blazers of the Central Hockey League. Recently retired Sporting Kansas City goalkeeper Jimmy Nielsen was named Energy FC head coach for the inaugural season. Tim McLaughlin, founder of Fields & Futures, joined the club as an ownership partner prior to the start of the 2014 season. Energy FC won their first match away to Orange County Blues FC on April 5 and played their first home match against Orlando City SC on April 26 at Bishop McGuinness Catholic High School's Pribil Stadium. The season ended with a 10th place finish – four points short of a playoff spot and averaging 3,702 in attendance for home matches. The club moved to the newly-renovated Taft Stadium for the 2015 season and finished second in the Western Conference, making the playoffs for the first time. Energy FC advanced to the Western Conference Final, where they lost to LA Galaxy II.

For the inaugural (2014.) season only, all games were broadcast on KXXY-FM radio with former Oklahoma sports personality Jack Damrill.For the 2016 and 2017 season Energy FC games were on local Television on KSBI on Cox Cable Oklahoma channel 7 and simulcasted on Cox digital HD channels 707. Currently the Oklahoma City Energy FC has no Radio or Television deal in place.

In 2016, the team finished 7th in the Western Conference and advanced to the Western Conference semifinals. Energy FC also advanced to the fourth round of the Lamar Hunt U.S. Open Cup after defeating cross-town rival Rayo OKC 2–1 in extra time. That year also saw Energy FC host Club Deportivo Guadalajara in a friendly match played in front of 6,687 fans at Taft Stadium. Energy FC made the playoffs for a third consecutive season in 2017 after finishing 6th in the Western Conference. Back-to-back road wins earned the team a berth in the Conference Final for the second time in three years. Energy FC lost the match to Swope Park Rangers in a penalty shootout that saw both sides attempting 10 shots each, with the deciding goals coming down to each teams' goalkeepers. That year also saw the club host another international friendly, against 2017 Champions League winners CF Pachuca.

Prior to the 2018 season, Steve Cooke was named head coach of the club, a year after serving as interim head coach at MLS side Colorado Rapids. Energy FC narrowly missed the USL Playoffs competing for a spot until the final month of the season. On June 4, 2021, following a winless start to the 2021 USL Championship season, Pascarella and the OKC Energy mutually agreed to part ways.

Although having not officially ceased operations, the club is currently not fielding a roster and has relieved head coach Leigh Veidman, having canceled their 2022 and 2023 seasons. The club cites inability to meet league requirements for field conditions.

Stadium
For the 2014 season, home games began being played at Pribil Stadium on the campus of Bishop McGuinness Catholic High School and introduced their team kits and logo. In 2015, the club moved to Historic Taft Stadium following extensive renovations made to that facility.

New stadium 
On December 10, 2019, Oklahoma City voters approved MAPS 4, a sales tax extension planned to fund 16 major projects over 8 years. MAPS 4 allocates $37 million towards the construction of a multipurpose stadium that would serve as the new home field for the Energy. As of October 2021, the city government is working to determine a final site and design for the stadium.

Club culture

Supporters
OKC Energy have five recognized supporters groups: 
The Grid, La Furia Verde, OKC Breakers, Northend United, and Main St. Greens.

Rivalries
OKC Energy's main rivals are FC Tulsa, with both teams being located in Oklahoma. The teams compete in the Black Gold Derby. The supporters group of both teams established a trophy, a 4-foot wrench painted with the colors of each team on either side, which is awarded to the regular season winner of the derby.
OKC lead the series against Tulsa in all competitions with a record of 10–8–5 (W-D-L). OKC have secured the wrench four years out of the seven that the rivalry has been in existence, in 2015, 2016, 2018, and 2019.

Affiliated teams
The club was formally associated with FC Dallas of Major League Soccer from 2015 through 2018. They were affiliated with Sporting Kansas City from 2014 through 2015.

Sponsorship
Local, family-owned First Fidelity Bank became the inaugural jersey sponsor in 2014.

Year-by-year
 All-time record: 86–76–94 W-D-L (includes USL regular season, USL playoffs, U.S. Open Cup)

Head coaches
 Includes USL regular season, USL playoffs, U.S. Open Cup

Top goalscorers
 Includes USL regular season, USL playoffs, U.S. Open Cup

References

External links
 
 Prodigal, LLC

 
Association football clubs established in 2013
USL Championship teams
Soccer clubs in Oklahoma
Soccer clubs in Oklahoma City
2013 establishments in Oklahoma